Naparima College (informally known as Naps) is a public secondary school for boys in Trinidad and Tobago. Located in San Fernando, the school was founded in 1894 but received official recognition in 1900. It was established by Dr. Kenneth J. Grant, a Canadian Presbyterian missionary working among the Indian population in Trinidad.  The school was one of the first to educate Indo-Trinidadians and played an important and crucial role in the development of an Indo-Trinidadian and Tobagonian professional class. Naparima is derived from the Arawak word (A) naparima, meaning ‘large water’, or from Nabarima, Warao for ‘Father of the waves’.

The school was founded in the churchyard of Susamachar Presbyterian Church in San Fernando as the Canadian Mission Indian School.  In 1899 the Mission Council petitioned the Board of Queen's Royal College in Port of Spain for affiliation with it.  In 1900 the school became a recognised secondary school and was thus eligible for state aid.  It was then renamed Naparima College.  In 1917 it relocated to its present campus at Paradise Hill on what was then the southern edge of the city.

History

1866 Rev. Dr. John Morton, a young Presbyterian minister from Bridgewater, Nova Scotia arrives in Trinidad and is deeply concerned at the social conditions of the population of 25,000 Indians working on the plantations. Morton receives approval of the Maritime synod of the Presbyterian church to found a mission to Trinidad. A friend and colleague, Rev. Dr. Kenneth James Grant from Scotch Hill, Pictou County, Nova Scotia, is appointed as a partner in the project.
1870 On November 22, Grant, with his newly wed wife Catherine Copeland of Merigomish, Nova Scotia, and Morton with his wife Sarah, arrive in San Fernando, Trinidad.
1870s Gordon, Governor of Trinidad, enacts education ordinance facilitating the establishment of Canadian Mission elementary schools. The "C.M." schools, large one-room wooden constructions, are established in a large number of rural communities in Trinidad, and flourish, eventually numbering over seventy.
1880 "Four stations (believed to be Tunapuna, San Fernando, Princes Town and Couva) have been established which serve all parts of Trinidad".
1883 Rev. Dr. Grant conducts first secondary school classes for his son George, other children of the Mission, and Charles Pasea, by tradition under a samaan tree on Carib Street, San Fernando, near his own home. This is the site of present-day Susamachar Presbyterian Church, and the Grant Memorial (elementary) School.
1890 Rev. Dr. Kenneth J. Grant receives approval of the church for the establishment of a theological training college. When broached to the Presbyterian Assembly in Ottawa, half of Dr Grant's requested funding is donated by two private families within forty-eight hours. This foundation stone of the ministry in Trinidad is later renamed the Presbyterian Training College and then the St Andrews Theological College.
1894 Naparima Training College for Teachers is opened; the secondary school classes to become Naparima College are initially merged with NTC classes.
1897 Naparima College is made into a separate institution by Rev. Dr. Kenneth J. Grant
1898 Rev. Grant purchases "Oriental Hall", land and buildings adjacent to his home, which serves for years as a base of operations for the missionaries, and a home for the early Presbyterian College, Naparima Training College, and Naparima College.
1900 Naparima College is formally inaugurated, affiliated with Queen's Royal College in Port of Spain, and loosely modeled after Pictou Academy in Pictou, Nova Scotia. Enrollment is 50, staff complement 4.
1904 The first class graduates as holders of the Cambridge Senior School Certificate
1917 Naparima College is moved to Paradise Pastures and the first buildings are constructed here overlooking the Gulf of Paria, immediately to the west of the town of San Fernando, where the institution has stood continuously since.
1923 Rev. V. B.Walls of Blackville, New Brunswick is appointed principal, and takes up residence on the hill in January 1924. He would serve for almost 30 years.
1925-1931 Additional buildings are constructed, including a dormitory, a dining hall (1925), an infirmary (1927), and the central part of the "U" design(1931).
1931 The central part of the old "U" building is built, together with the old science lab, and library. Enrollment stands at 200.
1932 The main building is constructed along with a Science Laboratory.
1936 The first to obtain the Higher School Certificate graduates. The T. Geddes Grant Memorial Dormitory is constructed.
1938 The school was chosen by the pioneering vendor of the product as the historical starting point for the sale the popular local snack known as Doubles (food). In fact, the very name given to the snack was first coined by students of the school whilst placing orders. 
1939 First Founders' Day celebration. The wings of the "U" structure are added, replacing two 1917 classrooms.
1945 Kathlyn W. Smith became the first girl and the first student of Naparima College to obtain an Island Scholarship. The Junior Red Cross is set up.
1946 Enrollment at Naparima College stands at 560, staff of 24 and on-campus residents of 72.
1948 Dr.the Hon. Eric Williams, the first Prime Minister of an independent Trinidad and Tobago in 1962, choose the school as one of the locations for the delivery of a series of political lectures that eventually led to the formation of the People's National Movement in 1955.
1950 Naparima's Golden Jubilee, and Rev. Walls' 25th year. A thousand people attend. In the spotlight with Rev. Walls are H.R.H. Princess Alice and the Earl of Athlone; Rev J. C. MacDonald (early principal), Sidney Hogben, Director of Education; Roy Joseph, Mayor; and many dignitaries. The present-day flag staff is donated by Trinidad Leaseholds Ltd and erected and used for the first time at the Golden Jubilee
1953 Rev. Walls retires (1952) and so the position of principal passes to Rev. E. T. Lute of Toronto.
1954 Permanent sites are secured for Tunapuna and Siparia campuses.
1956 Uniform of white shirts and silver-grey khaki trousers is established as well as the First Naparima College Sea Scout Troop.
1957 Larry Lutchmansingh becomes the first Naparima College boy to obtain an Open Scholarship.
1958 Introduction of the Naparima College Badge as part of the school's attire.
1959 Under Rev. E. T. Lute, new concrete and steel present-day buildings are constructed. The timber from the old 1931 buildings is used to build a new gymnasium, used until 1995. Rev. Lute also introduces the 'house system'. Six houses were originally set up, but this number was later reduced to four: Walls House (red); Sammy House (blue); Flemington House (gold); and Grant House (green). National independence of Trinidad looms, and it is evident that many institutions of the past will be passed to local autonomy. Enrollment stands at close to 700.
1960 Naparima celebrates its "Diamond Jubilee", the 60th year of its official recognition. Rev. Walls returns from his retirement in New Brunswick for the celebrations.
1962 Trinidad and Tobago becomes an independent country. Rev. James Forbes Sieunarine, (named after an early missionary) becomes the first principal to emerge from among the students of the Canadian Mission..
1963 The Walls Pavilion is constructed on the playing field off Rushworth St.
1966 Allan I. McKenzie is appointed principal.
1967 The dormitory is re-furbished as classroom space. This is also the last year that girls attend Naparima College. The present day school uniform is inaugurated.
1969 Won island-wide TTT Quiz contest as well as the Drama Festival's best production with A Little Soap and Water written and produced by Hafeezul Sukoorali.
1972 Won Best Production in the Drama Festival with Tears In the Gayelle written by Dennis Noel and produced by Rosemarie Wyse. A banquet is hend in honor of Sir Issac Hayatali on his appointment as Chief Justice of Trinidad and Tobago.
1975 The United Church Board of Missions formally closes the Canadian Mission to Trinidad. A chemistry lab is added.
1976 Trinidad and Tobago becomes a Republic nation. The following national trophies are won - National Championship Cricket, National Junior Cricket, National Inter-Col Final (football).
1976 Naparima College became the first team to win consecutive Inter-Col Finals.
1984 A Zoology laboratory is added.
1993 Naparima College establishes direct voice contact with NASA's Space Shuttle Columbia, specifically STS-58, whilst it was in orbit. 
1996 95% of the 120 boys writing the "O" level school-leaving exams secured passes in five or more subjects, the highest percentage of passes among the island's high schools.
1999 Naparima College won the South Zone SSFL Title, the SSFL League Title and Intercol Title and was reported in the media as being "The Triple Crown Winner".
2005 Demolition of the last remaining remnant of the 1931 main building and the water bay, simultaneously increasing the area used as the courtyard.
2006 Dr. Michael R. Dowlath, a past student and former principal of Iere High School, returns to Naparima College as principal.
2007 Naparima College ties for the most Intercol Titles in the country equalling San Fernando Technical & Signal Hill with 6.
2010 The main Staff Room was extended to better facilitate the teaching staff. Introduction of a new Form class – 6BS3. Establishment of a new classroom in the Grant's Memorial Wing to house the students of 6A.
2010 Naparima College records the most zonal wins for the South Zone Title, 14, and the most for any team in their respective zones.
2011 Reintroduction of the Teachers vs. Students Cricket Match on Founders' Day as well as the Naparima College Blazer for Form 6 students.  Hosts of bi-annual Presbyterian Games. Introduction of the Upper 6 Sleepover.(Year of proposed air-conditioning of the entire Form 6 Block as well as installation of security cameras on campus. )
2014 Naparima College wins the Under 19 division of the Barbados Cup football competition. The annual tournament attracts approximately 50 teams drawn from across the entire Caribbean – English, Spanish & French as well as occasionally teams from England, the United States of America and Canada.
2015 Naparima College attains the national standard of Diamond Standard Certification, an award and recognition given to organisations that have accomplished high standards in the delivery of public service in Trinidad and Tobago.
2015 Xante, an annual school concert was launched, showcasing the students' diverse talents including performances from the Naparima College Steel Orchestra, a drama presentation, soloists and a very creative, sign language choir. The concert was held at the National Academy for the Performing Arts South Campus, San Fernando.
2015 Naparima College wins all 3 major titles in the SSFL, a repeat of the feat accomplished back in 1999.
2016 Naparima College wins the Big 4 Title in the SSFL.
2017 bmobile partners with Naparima College to transform the school into Trinidad and Tobago's first smart school.
2017 Celebrated 100 years (centenary) on Paradise Hill.
2018 Naparima College wins all 3 major titles in the SSFL, a repeat of the feats accomplished back in 1999 and 2015.

Administration

Principals
The following is a chronological list of principals who have served at Naparima College.

Vice Principals
The following is a chronological list of vice principals who have served at Naparima College.

Campus
Naparima College's campus sits atop Paradise Hill, overlooking the city of San Fernando in southern Trinidad. The city's major landmark, the San Fernando Hill, towers over the college to the east; to the west is the Gulf of Paria. While the campus location has been the same for decades, there have been numerous infrastructural and developmental changes over the years.
Many of the major  changes had arisen out of the demolition of the old wooden buildings, most of which had been around since the first half of the 20th century. Most notably, the college's old gymnasium which was demolished in 1995, the Grant Memorial Building in 1999, and  the structure referred to as the "main building" in 2005.

The structure that replaced the Grant Memorial Building is referred to as the "Grant's Memorial Wing" or the "new Grant building". Almost twice as large as the old building, it consists of two levels and a basement area (at the western end). It possesses a number of classrooms, Conference, Geography, Business, Language, Art, and Science Demonstration Rooms as well as an "Intelligent Classroom" and Scout Den.

Directly adjacent to the Grant's Memorial Wing and connected via a pedestrian bridge is the Science laboratory building. Consisting of two levels, it contains a Chemistry laboratory on the first floor and Biology and Physics laboratories on the second floor.

Neighboring the laboratory building and connected by corridors on the second floor is another section which houses the library. Having undergone various remodeling sessions in the past few years, its design as of 2012 is the most effective for research and study purposes. The availability of its service characteristics means that the library can be considered to be a hybrid of both a reference and a lending library, albeit at a smaller scale for the institution. It possesses its own library staff, archives, Internet access as well as book rental and (magnetic card based) photocopying services.

Students at the Form 6 level are allowed unlimited access to the library throughout a regular school day while students of lower forms must seek administrative permission for the use of its services at any time other than the luncheon and recess periods.

Also in the same section, directly beneath the library on the first floor and accessed via corridors, is the Audio/Visual Room (abbreviated as the A/V Room), which is used for  displaying media to aid lectures and presentations to an audience, especially by a visiting party. Also located in this section of the building are the offices of the Deans of Discipline and the Dean of Studies.

Adjacent to the aforementioned section of the school, but directly joined to it, is an L-shaped building that contains a number or classrooms, an Information Technology Laboratory, storage room (neighboring the cafeteria), Staff Room (for the teaching administration) and the offices of the Principal and Vice-Principal and the Main Office.

The washroom and shower facilities available for the student population and visitors alike are located on the western end of the campus, next to what is the Form 1 and 2 Blocks. These facilities are also located on the first floor of the gymnasium.

The cafeteria (known as The Café) is located on the northernmost sector of the campus. It has been extensively remodeled in the last few years, with its current design covering the largest area since Naparima College was founded.
The main section of the cafeteria, located just under what is now the Form 1S classroom of the Form 1 block, is the main area of business where students and members of the administration can trade. Adjacent to this is the area dubbed the Café Verandah. This area includes seating with tables. Local food merchants are also allowed to market there with permission from the administration. Students may purchase before and after regular school hours and during the luncheon and recess periods. The cafeteria staff reserves the right to bar any student from trading during class hours unless that student is accompanied with a written note provided by a member of the teaching or office administration.

There is also a small snack bar located in what had been a security booth located at the start of the sidewalk at the top of Paradise Hill. It allows students and administration greater flexibility in their choice of refreshment.

The structure known as the Principal's Residence is located a stone's throw away from the main structure and is out-of-bounds to the student population. It had been an old building which went unused for years until its reconstruction was proposed and eventually completed alongside the gymnasium.

Towards the eastern sector lies the gymnasium which is the most recent addition to the campus (along with the Principal's Residence). Whilst overlooking the on-campus playing field, it consists of three levels, the second and third of which serve a dual purpose of hosting indoor sporting events as well as an Auditorium. The first level, which may also be considered as a basement level, facilitates indoor sporting activities, physical training via the use of exercise equipment, as well as bathroom and shower facilities.

There are a number of outdoor facilities normally available for the purposes of recreational and leisure ventures and are scattered in and around the campus.

The college has two outdoor recreational grounds. The main on-campus general playing field is located at the westernmost sector of the school's compound, and is available for use by the student population at any time before and after regular class hours. However, most activity occurs during both the recess and luncheon periods. It may also be utilized by students for the purposes of scheduled Physical Education lessons. The field also possess its own batting cage for the purposes of cricket practice.

The second and perhaps major playing field is located on the Lewis Street extension, San Fernando and being off campus it is generally out-of-bounds to the student population. It is mainly utilized for larger sporting events such as inter-school sporting competitions or for the events of Sports Day.

The spectator stand on the off-campus playing field which is known as the V.B. Walls Pavilion was constructed by the Naparima College Old Boys Association in 1965. Its name is a dedication to Rev. Dr. Victor B. Walls, a Naparima College principal from 1924 to 1953. It is scheduled for reconstruction.

The courtyard or "quadrangle" is located in what may be considered as the heart of the campus and is bounded by the structure housing the form 4 and 5 blocks to the north, the science laboratory building to the east and Grant's Memorial Wing to the south whilst looking over the Gulf of Paria to the west.  Within the past few years, the area which was dedicated to the courtyard had dramatically increased. The old wooden structure commonly known as the main building and the structure known as the water bay were situated here but were both demolished in 2005. The courtyard is used by Naparima College as the student assembly grounds and for recreational activity.

Other miscellaneous facilities or features around the campus include:
 A terrace above the scout den, overlooking the Gulf of Paria on the western sector
 Park benches at strategic locations
 Sinks located near Grant's Memorial Wing and the Form 1 Block
 A pedestrian shelter located at the entrance to Paradise Hill
 Vehicular parking for administrative staff, visitors and form 6 students

Form levels

Forms 1 – 5 levels

Each form level from 1 to 5 is usually sub-divided into four Form Classes.
Each class in a form level is given the number of the form level and distinguished from each other by one of four letters – 'N', 'A', 'P' and  'S' (Naps - an abbreviation of 'Naparima College' used in general references). For instance, at the first form level the classes are Form 1N, 1A, 1P and 1S; with the pattern continuing up each successive form level. Normally each form class contained the same group of students that began together in the first form level, i.e. for example the same students who reside in Form 1N would be promoted to Form 2N. This trend continued until the Forth Form level where students were separated and grouped into classes based on their choice of CSEC subjects. However, in order to expose students to a greater number of individuals, this trend was changed whereby when progressing up each successive form level at the start of a new academic year, the students groups within each form level are changed that is, students do not progress the form levels with the same group they had started out with in the first form level.

The form classes:
 Form 1 – 1N, 1A, 1P & 1S
 Form 2 – 2N, 2A, 2P & 2S
 Form 3 – 3N, 3A, 3P & 3S
 Form 4 – 4N, 4A, 4P & 4S
 Form 5 – 5N, 5A, 5P & 5S

Form 6 level

The form 6 level is usually treated as a separate branch of classes and as such does not conform to the usual class-naming scheme as described above, instead having a unique scheme for both the Upper and Lower 6 classes. The Lower 6 Level is regarded as the level consisting of the younger form 6 students in their first year of CAPE study while the Upper 6 Level is regarded as the older students who are in their second and final year of CAPE study.

Naparima College tends to accept on average, eight external students into the Lower 6th Form Level per year. Usually these students only spend two years at the institution itself.

The Upper 6 students are acknowledged as being in their final year at Naparima College, after having spent seven years (external students spend fewer years) at the institution.

The form classes:

Lower 6 Level:
6BA
6BS1
6BS2
6BS3

Upper 6 Level:
6A
6AS1
6AS2
6AS3

The promotion scheme is the same with students being allowed the opportunity of promotion into the appropriate class as shown below.

The 6AS3 form class was officially recognized in September of the academic year spanning 2011–2012.
There are 28 populated form classes at present.

Academics

Naparima College offers a diverse selection of subject areas. Many of which are drawn from the fields of Science, Mathematics, Business Studies, Modern Studies and Creative Arts.

At the end of three years, Form 3 students must sit the National Certificate of Secondary Education (NCSE) examinations. Whilst at the end of five years, Form 5 students sit the Caribbean Secondary Education Certificate Examinations (CSEC) examinations and the Caribbean Advanced Proficiency Examinations (CAPE) Examinations at the Form 6 level.

Form 1 Level

The Form 1 Level consists of the youngest students at Naparima College. Academically, the subjects offered to these students are extremely similar to what they were exposed to at the Primary Level albeit, a little more advanced. Students at this level may be allowed to go into the Library during regular class hours for periods of study.

Subjects offered at the Form 1 Level:

Art
Drama
English Language
English Literature
French - As of 2016
Integrated Science
Information Technology
Health and Family Life Education
Mathematics
Music
Physical Education
Religious Instructions
Social Studies
Spanish
Technical Education
History

Form 2 Level

Subjects offered at the Form 2 Level:
Art
Biology
Chemistry
English Language
English Literature
French - as of 2017
History
Mathematics
Information Technology
Physical Education
Physics
Social Studies/History
Spanish

Form 3 Level

The form 3 level is the level at which students prepare for the National Certificate of Secondary Education (NCSE) examinations. Essentially, students at this level are exposed to all the academic fields of study offered at Naparima College. Thus aiding them in selecting subjects for further study at the CSEC level and possible careers. They are also encouraged to attend the Career Guidance Seminars held annually at Naparima College.

Subjects offered at the Form 3 Level:
Art
Biology
Business Studies
Chemistry
Drama
English Language
English Literature
French
Geography
History
Information Technology
Mathematics
Music
Physical Education
Physics
Spanish

Forms 4 & 5 Levels

The Form 4 & 5 Levels are the levels at which students prepare for the Caribbean Secondary Education Certificate Examinations – CSEC

Entry into Form 4 is based on the subjects selected by students upon promotion from the Form 3 Level. Each student is required to study at least nine subjects, four of which are compulsory – English Language, English Literature, Mathematics and either a choice of Biology or Human and Social Biology. Students continue into Form 5 with the subjects they have selected and write the CSEC examinations at the end of their 5th Form academic year.

Subjects offered at the Form 4 & 5 Levels:
Additional Mathematics
Biology - compulsory
Chemistry
English Language – compulsory
English Literature – compulsory
French
Geography
History
 Human & Social Biology
Information Technology
Mathematics – compulsory
 Physical Education
Physics
Principles of Accounts
Principles of Business
Social Studies
Spanish

The following subjects are also offered at the Form 4 & 5 Levels albeit not during normally timetabled sessions:
Technical Drawing
Visual and Performing Arts (one choice of either Art or Music or Drama)

Sixth form

The sixth form is split into two sub-levels, the Lower Sixth Form and the Upper Sixth Form. These are the levels at which students prepare for the Caribbean Advanced Proficiency Examinations – CAPE

Application to this level may occur after fifth form students obtain their CSEC results. Students at this level are allowed a choice to study 3 academic subjects (some opt for 4 and may be accepted) and 1 compulsory subject Communication Studies at the lower sixth form and Caribbean Studies at the upper sixth form. However choice of subjects is limited; for example, a student who only studied modern studies subjects at the CSEC level (History, Social Studies etc.) is barred to study subjects such as Pure Mathematics or Physics at the CAPE level.

Subjects at the CAPE Level tend to be divided into Units. Lower sixth form students study Unit 1 of their chosen subjects while the Unit 2 subject counterparts are studied at the Upper sixth form level. However exceptions may be made in which the Unit 2 of a subject may be studied at the lower sixth form followed by Unit 1 at the upper sixth form. Only the Units 1 of the compulsory subjects – Caribbean Studies and Communication Studies are studied.

Subjects offered at the Sixth Form Level:
Accounting
 Animation and game design
 Applied mathematics
Biology
Caribbean studies – compulsory
Chemistry
Communication studies – compulsory
 Computer science
Economics
 Entrepreneurship
Environmental science
French
Geography
History
 Information technology
Literature in English
Management of business
Performing arts
 Physical education
Physics
Pure mathematics
Sociology
Spanish

 President Medal Gold Winners 
The President's Medal Gold is awarded to the highest performing student nationally in the Caribbean Advanced Proficiency Examinations(CAPE) each year. As of 2021, Naparima College has won the President's Medal Gold six times.

Admissions

Admission to Naparima College is determined by performance on an examination, known as the Secondary Entrance Assessment (S.E.A) .Being a Denominational school that was originally founded by Christian missionaries from Canada, the Presbyterian Church in Trinidad and Tobago (PCTT) has the prerogative of selecting 20% of the annual intake of new students into Form 1. This is a practice that is also exercised by all of the other religious organisations in Trinidad and Tobago (e.g. the Roman Catholic Church, the Anglican Church, the Anjuman Sunnat ul Jamaat Association (A.S.J.A.) and the Sanatan Dharma Maha Sabha (S.D.M.S.)) where they have jurisdiction over secondary schools in this regard and therefore should not be construed as unfair in any way whatsoever. The S.E.A examination comprises three papers that must be attempted by all candidates; Creative Writing, Mathematics and Language Arts.
Naparima College tends to be an institution of first choice of the four prospective institutions each examine is required to list, in preferential order of interest prior to the examination. The four preferences are drawn from the totality of secondary institutions in Trinidad and Tobago. For a candidate to attain admission, he must obtain a percentage of 94–100 after writing the examinations. Female students have not been accepted since 1967 and can instead apply for the Naparima Girls High School.

Student life

Naparima College offers a range of clubs and activities which students may join.

Extracurricular activities are strongly supported by the administration and the teaching staff as it provides the skills for students at Naparima College to develop themselves into all-rounded individuals and is particularly one of the reasons the school has been able to perform outstanding in all aspects as an educational institution.

The following is a list (as of September 2015) of clubs and activities:

 1st Naparima College Sea Scout Troop
 African Cultural Club  - A.C.C
Art Club
Astronomy Club
 Audio-Visual Club
 Anime Club
 Big-Brother Program
Chess Club
 Club Castilé  – The UNESCO Spanish Club
 Culinary Club 
 Drama Club
 Disaster Preparedness Club
 Environmental Club
 Essay Writing
 Film and Photography Club
 French Club
Geography Club
Guitar Club
 Indian Cultural Club – I.C.C.
Information Technology (I.T.) Club
Inter School Christian Fellowship – I.S.C.F.
Keyboard/Piano Club
Mathematics Club
Naparima College Choir
Naparima College Pan Ensemble – NaparhythmsNaparima College Islamic Society − N.C.I.S
Naparima College Media Association  - N.C.M.A
Rotary International – Interact Club
Rhythm Section
Scrabble Club
Sports – Cricket, Football, Table Tennis, Lawn Tennis, Martial Arts, Athletics, Volleyball, Golf, Swimming, Scuba Diving, Badminton and more.
 Student Council
 Spanish Club
Tassa Group
  The Literary and Debating Society – L.A.D.S.
The Naparima College Peer Supporters
 Writers' Guild 
- More clubs to be stated

The following competitions occur within Naparima College. Hence this does not include students who participate in competitions to which Naparima College is not the host of. Such would fall into the aforementioned category of Extra-curricular activities and clubs, whose members (and members of the student population not related to a club or activity) are allowed to 'represent' the school in various external competitions. However they may be considered as a sub-class of extra-curricular activity.

Competitions within Naparima College include:

Elocution Contest
Events of Sports Day
Oration Contest
Science Fair
Inter-class Competitions

Such activities and clubs have regular meetings and encourage their members to participate in various competitions or creative events and even charity. If any student wishes to suggest an activity not listed, they may petition and propose their idea to any one of the administrative teaching staff and have it evaluated. As such the aforementioned list is constantly growing.

Academic year

The following is a list of events that are annually held at Naparima College during each academic year. (Some events may not occur during the term mentioned and as such, may be subjected to change). The events are listed in the order of occurrence.

Term 1
Interclass Football Competition
School Bazaar (Normally The First Saturday in October)
Speech Day
Oration Contest
Eid Celebrations
Divali Celebrations
End of Term Examinations
Christmas Celebrations

Term 2

Parents' Day
Inter-Class Cricket Tournament
Founder's Day
Teachers Vs. Students Annual Cricket Match
Elocution Contest
Sports Day
Carnival Celebrations
Naparima College's Annual Walkathon
End of Term Examinations
Easter Celebrations
Upper 6 Sleepover

Term 3

Annual Prize Giving and Awards Functions
Student Baccalaureate Service
CSEC and CAPE Examinations
End of Term Examinations
Graduates' Dinner and Dance

Apart from those listed, numerous other events occur at various times throughout an academic year at Naparima College.

These may include the following:
Regular meetings of the Naparima Association of Parents School and Community (NAPSAC)
Fundraisers (hosted by student clubs)
Events hosted by the Naparima Association of Past Students (NAPS) such as the "Breakfast On The Hill" or the "Naps Men Can Cook Too"
Career Guidance Seminars (other secondary schools may be invited to attend)
Eid Celebrations
Valedictory Ceremonies

Various other special occasions may also be held.

The first major event would be that of the annual school bazaar which takes place on the school's campus. This social event normally occurs during the month of October and is usually on a weekend, most commonly on a Saturday afternoon. Each class would be given the responsibility of a particular stall from which planning may begin a few weeks beforehand. These stalls may take the form of many miscellaneous activities including games such as the popular air rifle or the tin pan alley, sale of food and drinks, and attractions such as a horror house, car show and disco. The entire bazaar itself serves a dual purpose of being both a social event and a fundraiser.

Speech Day is usually the day which might also be referred to as a Graduation Day, however it is also the day for recognizing the academic achievements of both the Form 5 and Upper Form 6 students, the latter of whom it would be considered as a Graduation Day. Certificates and awards for academic achievements in the Caribbean Secondary Education Certificate examinations and Caribbean Advanced Proficiency Examinations as well as other academic achievements are distributed to the students at this official ceremony. Teachers, parents, guardians and special guests are normally issued invitations to attend.

House system

The House System was instituted in 1959 by then-principal Rev. Lute. Each member of the student population is usually assigned to a particular house during their form 1 year and remain in that house during the rest of their academic career at Naparima College.

The houses usually compete with each other in some aspects of school life, most significantly is that of the annual Sports Day, where each house competes for the top ranking in sporting activities at Naparima College. Initially there were six houses but was then reduced to four.

The four houses are as follows:

 Flemington House (gold) – named for Allen Flemington, who served as a missionary and a French teacher at the school from 1939 to 1940.  He left the school to volunteer for service in World War II as a fighter pilot, where he died in combat.
 Grant House (green) – named for the founder of Naparima College, Kenneth J. Grant.
 Sammy House (blue) – named for James Sammy, who taught at Naparima College from 1912 to 1968.He was the father of two other Masters at the College - Carl Sammy, long standing History teacher at Naparima College until his retirement in 2006  and David Sammy, former Vice Principal at Naparima College who later went on to become the Principal of Tableland High School in 2009.
 Walls House (red) – named for long-serving principal, Victor B. Walls.

Publications

The Olympian Magazine
Naparima College has a school magazine dubbed The Olympian which was started in 1945 by Ralph Laltoo. Efforts are made to publish one annually. It usually acts as a yearbook and highlights the events which may have transpired during a particular academic year at Naparima College. These may include academic and sporting achievements as well as brief summaries of extracurricular clubs and activities and special events such as the school bazaar or valedictory functions. Many of these normally being from the perspective of the student population.

The Naparima College Handbook

Normally issued to students during their Form 1 year, the Naparima College Handbook outlines the rules of the institution, codes of conduct as well as other information regarding school life.

Notable alumni

Miscellanea

Motto"A posse ad esse"''

This Latin phrase literally translates into English as "From Possibility To Actuality".

The motto was selected by a contest launched by Rev. Dr. Victor B. Walls among the staff and students shortly after his arrival in 1923. The identity of the person who coined the motto remains a mystery. The motto serves as a force to encourage students to strive to be the best that they can be in all aspects of school life and in their other achievements. It is inscribed on the school's insignia.

Rationale

Naparima College, the pioneer secondary school in San Fernando, was founded in 1894 by the Canadian Presbyterian Missionaries to spread education and civilisation amongst the depressed indentured immigrant population.

College Hymn or College Anthem
This college hymn was written around 1930 by Marion Elizabeth Walls, the wife of Reverend Victor Benjamin Walls. The melody is that of a well-known 18th-century evangelical hymn, recorded in the Anglican and Presbyterian hymn-books, and known variously as The Church of God, Thou whose Almighty Word, and Come, thou Almighty King.

See also

 Naparima Girls' High School
 Hillview College
 Iere High School
 List of schools in Trinidad and Tobago

References

External links
 Official Site
 Alumni Site
 Naparima Alumni Association of Canada

Educational institutions established in 1894
Buildings and structures in San Fernando, Trinidad and Tobago
Presbyterian schools in Trinidad and Tobago
1894 establishments in Trinidad and Tobago
Schools in Trinidad and Tobago